Benton Jennings (born October 27) is an American film, television, commercial, voice-over, and stage actor, writer and director based in Los Angeles, CA.

Career 
He attended Texas Christian University (TCU) in Fort Worth, Texas with a BFA in Theatre Arts, London Academy of Music and Dramatic Art (LAMDA), and The Film Actors Lab in Dallas, Texas studying under Adam Roarke and Spencer Milligan.

Jennings has performed in over 60 film and television roles, and over 100 stage productions nationally, in the UK, and Europe. He also performed in over 6000 performances with the nationally touring and award winning sketch comedy troupe, "The Gunfighters", which he co-founded in 1975.

Jennings has won 27 Best Actor awards from film festivals for his performance as 'Rabbi' in the independent film "The Annunciation" including The New York Best Actor Awards, Best Shorts Competition, Accolade Global Film Competition, Depth of Field International Film Festival, LA Indies Awards, Toronto Independent Film Festival, San Francisco Indie Short Festival, Indiefest Film Awards, Hollywood International Golden Age Festival, and Berlin International Art Festival.

He has the dubious distinction of having portrayed Adolf Hitler five times: once on the TV soap Passions, David Zucker's 2008 comedy film An American Carol, the indie comedy feature Poolboy: Drowning Out The Fury with Kevin Sorbo, on Jimmy Kimmel Live! in the "Captain Mexico" parody sketch, ep 9.163, July 26, 2011, and February 2012 in a professional photo essay which depicts a time traveling assassin shooting Hitler.

In 2009, he became a series regular in the hit comedy web series Safety Geeks: SVI playing the role of Hopkins, a droll English butler. The series also stars Brittney Powell, Dave Beeler, Tom Konkle, and Mary Cseh. The series is a multiple award winner including "Best Film or TV Comedy" at the 1st International 3D Awards in Los Angeles.

In 2012 Jennings became a series regular on the award winning comedy web series School And Board playing school board president (and frozen yogurt tycoon) Mike Donovan. The series won "Outstanding Achievement - Ensemble Cast in a Comedy or Mockumentary Series" at the LA Web Fest.

Jennings was recently a member of the critically acclaimed SkyPilot Theatre Company in Los Angeles. While appearing in a production of Requiem for a Heavyweight by Rod Serling as the Doctor, having already received critical praise for the part ("...an excellent BENTON JENNINGS..." - Amy Bowker, The Tolucan Times) he stepped in to the lead role of Maish when actor Ken Butler became terminally ill, with only 4 days rehearsal to learn over 70 pages of dialog, and received standing ovations for his performances.

He is the youngest son of William Bryan Jennings who played the cop in the 1966 cult film favorite Manos: The Hands of Fate.

He is the founder of the living history organization, 93rd Sutherland Highland Regiment of Foot Living History Unit, organized in 1989.

Filmography

Television
 All American Cowboy (1985) – Gunfighter
 Dallas: The Early Years (1986) – Oil Man
 City Guys (2000) – Tony
 Charmed (2000) – Concerned Citizen
 The Frontier: Decisive Battles (2000) – Colonel Robert Dale
 The Last Dance (TV movie) (2000) – Mr. Macvey
 Profiler (2000) – Lance Persky
 Power Rangers Lightspeed Rescue (2000) – Mister Mesmer
 Family Law (2000) – Commissioner Ronald Kluft
 The Drew Carey Show (2001) – Bill
 Arli$$ (2001) – Dean Chance
 Strong Medicine (2001) – Worthington
 Passions (2002) – Adolf Hitler
 Mary Christmas (TV movie) (2002) – Dan Charles
 A.U.S.A. (2003) – Jury Foreman
 I'm With Her (2003) – Man
 JAG (2003) – Bailiff
 VH-1 Big in 04 (2004) – Bennington, Brigitte Nielson & Flava Flav's English Butler
 It's Always Sunny in Philadelphia (2005) – Pro-Lifer
 Without a Trace (2006) – NA Man
 Dexter (2006) – Gene Marshall
 12 Miles of Bad Road (2007) – Fred
 The Call (Pilot) (2007) – Pilgrim
 Jimmy Kimmel Live! (2004 – ) – Various sketch roles
 Nick Cannon Presents: Short Circuitz (2007) – Priest in HypeMan
 Heartland (2007) – Robert Grayson
 Scrubs (2007) – Mr. Hobbs
 Big Love (2010) – Dave
 Elevator Girl Hallmark Channel TV movie (2010) – Doug
 Greek (2011) – Professor
 The League (2010) – Brassy Judge
 How I Met Your Mother (2010) – Jordan
 The Event – (2011) NSA Supervisor
 Safety Geeks:SVI (2009) – Hopkins (Series Regular)
 School And Board (2012) – Mike Donovan (Series Regular)
 Vegas (2012) – Moderator
 Incredible Crew – Krumping High School Principal (a.k.a. Krumping H.S. Principal) (December 31, 2012 and February 7 and April 4, 2013)
 General Hospital – Swiss Doctor (2013)
 American Horror Story: Hotel – Butler Graves (2015)
 Documentary Now! - Mr. Runner Up: My Life as an Oscar Bridesmaid – Rich Snooty Man (2016)
 Dr. Ken – Middle Age Patient (2017)
 Shameless – Father Henry (2018)
 For All Mankind – Judge (2019)
 Our Flag Means Death – Anglican Priest (2021)
 Mrs. American Pie – Theodore Thimble, III (2022)
 I Think You Should Leave – Berl (2022)

Film
 Alamo: The Price of Freedom (1988) – Gordon C. Jennings
 Legacy (1990) – Governor Boggs
 Macon County War (1990) – Nathan Jackson (Lead)
 Highway to Hell (1990) – Toby Gilmore (Lead)
 Travis (1991) – Col. William Barrett Travis (Lead)
 Steele's Law (1991) – Agent West
 The Last of the Mohicans (1992) – Scottish Officer
 Shoo Fly (2001) – Doctor Bum the Messenger of the Gods (Lead)
 Sisyphus Rocks (2001) – Herman Perkins (Lead)
 Winning London (2001) – Chef (British hotel)
 Pollinator (2002) – Doctor Rappaccini
 Temptation (2003) – Boris, the Butler
 I-See-You.Com (2006) – HR Executive
 Mr. & Mrs. Smith (2005) – Maitre'd
 How Henri Came To Stay (2006) – Mr. Darly (Lead)
 San Saba (2008) – Arthur "Chip" Miller
 Poolboy: Drowning Out The Fury (2010) – Adolf Hitler
 San Francisco 2177 (2010) – Hoffman
 An American Carol (2008) – Adolf Hitler
 In Her Shoes (2005) – Shoe Salesman (John Johnson)
 Trouble Is My Business (2018) – Wilson Montemar
 The Annunciation (2018) – Rabbi (Lead)
 The Wedding Year (2019) – The Waiter

References

External links

Official Website
93rd Highlanders Living History
Benton Jennings Biography
Benton Jennings – The Gunfighters
SkyPilot Theatre Company, "Death and the Maiden"
Benton Jennings Youtube Channel
Benton Jennings Facebook Fan Page
"School And Board" 
"Safety Geeks: SVI" by Dave & Tom

Year of birth missing (living people)
Living people
Alumni of the London Academy of Music and Dramatic Art
American male film actors
American male stage actors
American male television actors
Texas Christian University alumni
Male actors from El Paso, Texas
Male actors from Fort Worth, Texas
American male Shakespearean actors